Sclerophrys poweri is a species of toad in the family Bufonidae. It is found in extreme southern Angola, northern Namibia, Botswana, southward to central South Africa, and Zambia. The specific name poweri honours John Hyacinth Power, Irish-born director of the McGregor Museum (Kimberley, South Africa) who collected amphibians as well as reptiles and plants.

Sclerophrys poweri inhabits open savanna, wooded savanna, thornveldt, river valleys, and agricultural areas. Breeding takes place in temporary water (vleis, marshes, dams, or pans), and sometimes artificial pools. It is a common and often abundant species that is not facing any significant threats and that is present in many protected areas.

References

poweri
Frogs of Africa
Amphibians of Angola
Amphibians of Botswana
Amphibians of Namibia
Amphibians of South Africa
Amphibians of Zambia
Taxa named by John Hewitt (herpetologist)
Amphibians described in 1935
Taxonomy articles created by Polbot